Registered Science Technician (RSciTech) is a professional qualification for science technicians that was introduced in 2011 alongside Registered Scientist as an extension to the UK Science Council's existing professional register for Chartered Scientists. the Registered Science Technician (RSciTech) was developed with the support of the Gatsby Charitable Foundation, with the aim of increasing the professionalism and recognition of those working in technical roles in science. Holders of this qualification can use the post-nominal letters RSciTech. Registration as RSciTech has been encouraged by institutions such as Imperial College London, and the UK Government's Science manufacturing technician and Laboratory technician apprenticeship standards are designed to lead to registration as an RSciTech.

Licensed Bodies 
The Science Council licences its member bodies to award professional statuses. The professional bodies listed below are those licensed to award Registered Science Technician as of May 2017:
 Association for Science Education
 British Psychological Society
 Institute of Animal Technology
 Institute of Biomedical Science
 Institute of Food Science & Technology
 Institute of Materials, Minerals and Mining
 Institute of Physics
 Institute of Science and Technology
 Institute of Physics and Engineering in Medicine
 Institution of Chemical Engineers
 Institute of Water
 Royal Society of Biology
 Royal Society of Chemistry

References 

2012 introductions
Professional certification in science
Educational qualifications in the United Kingdom
Science and technology in the United Kingdom